Cynthia I. Cloud (born February 22, 1969) is the former Republican state auditor of Wyoming, United States, the twentieth person to hold the position. She was elected in 2010, when the incumbent Rita Meyer instead ran unsuccessfully for governor of Wyoming against fellow Republican Matt Mead.

Education
Cloud graduated magna cum laude from the University of Alabama at Tuscaloosa, Alabama, with a degree in accounting. When she previously resided in Cody, she completed the Park County Leadership Institute.

Personal life
Cynthia and her husband, Charles Morgan Cloud, have four children.

Electoral history

External links
 Wyoming State Auditor

1969 births
21st-century American politicians
Living people
People from Cody, Wyoming
Politicians from Cheyenne, Wyoming
State Auditors of Wyoming
University of Alabama alumni
Wyoming Republicans
Women in Wyoming politics
21st-century American women politicians